Leader Publications is a Sri Lankan newspaper publisher. Its publications are The Sunday Leader, Morning Leader and Iruresa It  was founded by Lal Wickrematunge and Lasantha Wickrematunge. It is known for its independent news coverage and it has faced arson attacks from men with complicity from the Sri Lankan authorities.

References

External links
Continuing trend” towards stifling free media
The Morning Leader Website
Morning Leader